Nagar River forms parts of the international border between Bangladesh and India, between the state of Maharaja Hat West Bengal and the districts of Panchagarh and Thakurgaon of Rangpur Division of Bangladesh. It is one of the important rivers of Haripur Upazila in Thakurgaon District. It is navigable by boats only in the wet season.

References

Rivers of Bangladesh
Rivers of Rangpur Division